A restaurant tram is a tram vehicle where meals can be served in a way of a full-service, sit-down restaurant. Customers consume the meals while the tram is following a route over an existing network of a tramsystem. Old trams are used with a rebuild interior with upholstered seats and tables. Most restaurant trams are equipped with a small kitchen used just before serving the meals, while a kitchen in a restaurant is used to do most preparations.

Examples
In 1976 the first restaurant of this type started running in Bern using a historic tramcar and trailer. In 1983 a business started running in Melbourne using three historic W-class trams, but the service had to close in 2018 because the trams were seen as too unsafe to operate between other traffic.
Milan followed; since 2005 two historic tramcars -Class 1500- from 1928 are in use as a restaurant. Other cities with a restaurant tram are Brussels, The Hague, Rotterdam, Bern, Zurich, Timisoara, Kolkota and Christchurch. Helsinki has a variant since 1995, being a pub tram.

The U76/U70 tram line between the German cities of Düsseldorf and Krefeld used to offer a Bistrowagen ("dining car" in German), where passengers could order drinks and snacks. That practice dates back to the early 20th century, when interurban trams conveyed a dining car. Despite the introduction of modern tram units in 1981, four trams still had a Bistrowagen that operated every weekday early 21st century.

Gallery

See also
 Dining car

References

Tram vehicles
Rail catering
Restaurants by type